Lee Soo-hyuck is a South Korean diplomat who has served as the South Korean ambassador to the United States since 2019. He was appointed as South Korea's ambassador to the U.S. in 2019 by South Korean president Moon Jae-in.

See also
South Korea–United States relations

References 

Living people
South Korean diplomats
Ambassadors of South Korea to the United States
1949 births
Ambassadors of South Korea to Germany
Seoul National University alumni
Yonsei University alumni